Douglas Walter Hambidge was the seventh Bishop of Caledonia and New Westminster; and ninth Metropolitan of British Columbia.He was born  in London on  6 March 1927, educated at London University and  ordained in 1953. After a curacy at St Mark's, Dalston he held incumbencies at Cassiar, Smithers and Fort St John. In 1969 he became Bishop of Caledonia and in 1980 was translated to New Westminster. In 1981 he became Metropolitan of British Columbia, resigning in 1993. From then until his retirement Principal, St Mark's Theological College and an Assistant Bishop in Dar es Salaam.

Notes

1927 births
Clergy from London
University of Toronto alumni
Anglican bishops of Caledonia
Anglican bishops of New Westminster
20th-century Anglican Church of Canada bishops
20th-century Anglican archbishops
Metropolitans of British Columbia
Living people
British emigrants to Canada